John Bourchier, 2nd Baron Berners (1467 – 19 March 1533) was an English soldier, statesman and translator.

Family
John Bourchier, born about 1467, was the only son of Sir Humphrey Bourchier (d.1471 at the Battle of Barnet) and Elizabeth Tilney (d.1497), the daughter and sole heir of Sir Frederick Tilney of Boston, Lincolnshire. Through his father, Bourchier was descended from King Edward III; his great-grandmother, Anne of Gloucester, was the daughter of Thomas of Woodstock, King Edward's youngest son.

By his mother's first marriage, Bourchier had two sisters, Margaret, who married firstly, John Sandys, secondly, Sir Thomas Bryan, and thirdly, David Zouche, and Anne, who married Thomas Fiennes, 8th Baron Dacre of Gilsland.

After the death of Sir Humphrey Bourchier, his widow, Elizabeth, married Thomas Howard, then Earl of Surrey, and later 2nd Duke of Norfolk. By his mother's second marriage Bourchier had ten siblings of the half blood, Thomas Howard, 3rd Duke of Norfolk, Lord Edward Howard, Lord Edmund Howard, Sir John Howard, Henry Howard, Charles Howard, Henry Howard (again), Richard Howard, Elizabeth Howard, and Muriel Howard.

Career
After his father was slain fighting on the Yorkist side at the Battle of Barnet in 1471, Bourchier became a ward of John Howard, 1st Duke of Norfolk. As noted above, Bourchier's mother, Elizabeth, had married as her second husband Thomas Howard, the eldest son and heir of Bourchier's guardian by his first wife, Katherine Moleyns. In 1474 Bourchier's grandfather, John Bourchier, 1st Baron Berners, died, and Bourchier inherited the title at the age of seven.

He was educated at Oxford University and in 1477 created a Knight of the Bath. In 1492 he contracted to serve in the wars overseas and took part in suppressing the Cornish rebellion of 1497 in support of Perkin Warbeck. In 1513 he was engaged at the capture of Thérouanne and in 1520 accompanied Henry VIII and his entourage of peers and knights to the king's meeting in France with Francis I of France at the Field of the Cloth of Gold.

Bourchier held various offices of state under King Henry VIII, including Lieutenant of Calais from 28 November 1520 and Chancellor of the Exchequer from 14 July 1524.

He translated, at the King's desire, Froissart's Chronicles (1523–1525), in such a manner as to make a distinct advance in English historical writing, and the Golden Book of Marcus Aurelius (1534), as well as The History of Arthur of Lytell Brytaine (Brittany), and the romance of Huon of Bordeaux.

Bourchier died at Calais in 1533.

Marriage and issue
Before 13 May 1490 Bourchier married his step-father's half-sister, Katherine Howard, the daughter of John Howard, 1st Duke of Norfolk, by his second wife, Margaret Chedworth, daughter of Sir John Chedworth, and by her had a son and three daughters:

Thomas Bourchier, who predeceased his father.
Joan Bourchier (d. 1561), who married Sir Edmund Knyvet (d. 1 May 1539), sergeant porter to King Henry VIII, and was her father's heir, and had:
John Knyvett, father of Thomas Knyvett, 4th Baron Berners (1539–1616)
Margaret Bourchier, who predeceased her father.
Mary Bourchier, who married Alexander Unton of Wadley, but died without issue, predeceasing her father.

By a mistress Bourchier had three illegitimate sons and an illegitimate daughter:

Humphrey Bourchier (d. 1540), esquire, who married Elizabeth Bacon, but had no issue. 
Sir James Bourchier (d. 1554), who married Mary Bannaster, daughter of Sir Humphrey Bannaster.
George Bourchier
Ursula Bourchier, who married Sir William Sharington.

After Humphrey Bourchier's death his widow married George Ferrers, esquire.

Footnotes

References

External links

Ancestry

1467 births
1533 deaths
People from Hertfordshire
Knights of the Bath
Chancellors of the Exchequer of England
John Bourchier, 2nd Baron Berners
15th-century English people
15th-century English writers
16th-century English writers
16th-century male writers
English translators
English male non-fiction writers
16th-century English nobility
2